The Quick and the Dead is a 1963 war film directed by Robert Totten, set in Nazi-occupied Europe during World War II.

Plot
A group of American soldiers and Italian partisans during World War II join forces in northern Italy against the Germans.

Cast
 Victor French as Milo Riley
 Majel Barrett as Teresa
 Louis Massad as Donatelli
 Sandy Donigan as Maria
 James Almanzar as Giorgio
 Larry Mann as Parker
 Jon Cedar as Lt. Rogers
 Joe Folino as American Soldier
 Gerald Ervin as  American Soldier
 Joseph Locastro as Giovanni
 William Kirschner as Dr. Romano
 Frank D'Agostino as Priest
 Stuart Nisbet as Nazi Officer
 Ted French as Old Man
 Jack Crawford as American Officer
 Robert Harker as German Officer

References

Citations

Sources

External links

1963 films
Films set in Italy
American World War II films
Films directed by Robert Totten
1960s English-language films
1960s American films